Muradiye station is a station in Muradiye, Yunusemre, Turkey, just  from Manisa. TCDD Taşımacılık operates six trains, all terminating at Basmane Terminal in Izmir, totaling to 12 daily trains by January 2020.

Muradiye station was originally built in 1865 by the Smyrna Cassaba Railway.

Gallery

References

External links
Station information
Station timetable

Railway stations in Manisa Province
1865 establishments in the Ottoman Empire
Railway stations opened in 1865
Manisa